Shendu Highway, formerly Aerospace Museum, is an interchange station between Line 8 and Pujiang line of the Shanghai Metro in the town of Pujiang, Minhang District, Shanghai, at Shendu Highway and Puxing Highway. This station serves as the southern terminus of Line 8 and the northern terminus of the Pujiang line, and opened on 5 July 2009, with the second phase of Line 8.

Naming 
The station was named Aerospace Museum until 31 August 2013, when it was changed to Shendu Highway. It was expected to undergo another name change to Pujiang Country Park with the opening of the Pujiang line. However, this name change is no longer being considered.

Station Layout

References 

Railway stations in Shanghai
Line 8, Shanghai Metro
Pujiang line
Shanghai Metro stations in Minhang District
Railway stations in China opened in 2009